Nicolás Pereda (born 1982) is a Mexican-Canadian film director. To date, he has directed nine features and three short films.

Personal life 
Pereda was born in Mexico City in 1982; he holds dual Mexican and Canadian citizenship and is a resident of Toronto, where he studied filmmaking at York University.

He is married to film director Andrea Bussmann, with whom he codirected the 2016 film Tales of Two Who Dreamt.

Career 
Pereda's films, which have been financed by both Mexican and Canadian funds, have been predominantly shot in Mexico and are "resolutely Mexican in their intimate attention to class, culture, social structure, and family relations in Mexican society."

His films have been exhibited in festivals around the world, including at the Venice Film Festival, Berlinale, Rotterdam, and the Toronto International Film Festival. Pereda's work has also been presented at several retrospectives in various festivals, cinemateques and archives around the world, including the Anthology Film Archives, the Pacific Film Archive, and the Harvard Film Archive, which wrote of his work: "Pereda’s films are resolutely Mexican in focus and almost exclusively deal with stories drawn directly from the everyday lives and worlds of their working-class characters."

His films have been described as "meticulous, minimalist, deadpan."

Other work 
He formerly served as the Director of the Filmmaking Program, a new BFA program at the Mason Gross School of the Arts at Rutgers University in New Jersey. He is currently an Assistant Professor at University of California, Berkeley.

Awards 

 2016		Special Mention – RIDM, Montreal, Canada for Tales of Two who Dreamt
 2016		Best film– FICUNAM, Mexico for Minotaur
 2015		Special Mention – Margenes Festival, Spain for The Absent
 2014		Best film– FICUNAM, Mexico for The Palace
 2013 		Best documentary – Curtas Vila Do Conde, Portugal for The Palace
 2013		Special Mention- Cosquín Film Festival, Argentina for The Palace
 2013		Best Documentary – Alucine Film Festival, Canada for The Palace
 2013 		Jay Scott Prize -Toronto Film Critics Association, Canada
 2012		Grand Prix du Jury - Festival La Roche-sur-Yon, France for Greatest Hits
 2012		Fipresci Award – Habana Film Festival, Cuba for Greatest Hits
 2012		Best director - Lakino :: Latin Film Festival Berlin, Germany for Greatest Hits
 2012		Best film – Baja Film Festival, Los Cabos, Mexico for Greatest Hits 
 2012		Best film – Courtisane Film Festival, Belgium for Interview with the earth
 2011		Best film – Cinema of the Future – BAFICI, Argentina for Summer of Goliath
 2010		Premio Orizzonti – Venice Film Festival, Italy for Summer of Goliath
 2010		Best film – Valdivia International Film Festival, Chile for Summer of Goliath
 2010		Critics prize - Valdivia International Film Festival, Chile for Summer of Goliath
 2010		Special Mention – L’alternativa, Spain for Summer of Goliath
 2010		Images Prize - Images Festival, Toronto for All things were now overtaken by silence
 2010		Best film - World Cinema Amsterdam, Netherlands for Juntos
 2010		Best film - Guadalajara International Film Festival, Mexico for Perpetuum Mobile
 2009		Best film - Monterrey International Film Festival, Mexico for Perpetuum Mobile
 2009		Best director - Gramado International Film Festival, Brasil for Perpetuum Mobile
 2009		Best film -Under construction, Toulouse Film Festival, France for Perpetuum Mobile
 2009 		K.M. Hunter Artist Award, Canada
 2008		Best film - Levante Film Festival, Italia for Interview with the Earth
 2008		Best documentary - Curtas Vila do Conde, Portugal for Interview with the Earth
 2008		Best documentary – Guanajuato film festival, Mexico for Interview with the Earth
 2008		Best documentary - Flexiff, Australia for Interview with the Earth
 2008		French critics award - Toulouse Film Festival, France for Where are their Stories
 2007		Best film - Morelia International Film Festival, Mexico for Where are their Stories

Filmography
Where Are Their Stories? - 2007
Together (Juntos) - 2009
Perpetuum Mobile - 2009
All Things Were Now Overtaken by Silence - 2010
Summer of Goliath - 2010
The Greatest Hits - 2012
Killing Strangers - 2013
Los ausentes - 2014
The Empty Classroom (El aula vacía) -2015
Minotaur - 2015
Tales of Two Who Dreamt (Historias de dos que soñaron) - 2016
My Skin, Luminous - 2019
Fauna - 2020
Dear Chantal - 2021

References

External links

Living people
Mexican film directors
Film directors from Toronto
York University alumni
1982 births
Mexican emigrants to Canada